Dream Institute of Technology (DIT) is a private engineering college located in Thakurpukur, Kolkata, India. It was founded in 2006 by "Sarkar Trust". The institute is affiliated to West Bengal University of Technology and all courses are approved by AICTE.  Techwala a digital marketing consultant in Kolkata, maintains DIT's social media and other technical area related to website.

References

External links 
 

Engineering colleges in Kolkata
Colleges affiliated to West Bengal University of Technology
Educational institutions established in 2006
2006 establishments in West Bengal